Deh-e Rais (also Romanized as Deh-e Ra’īs; also known as Deh-e Ra’īs-e Gārūk, Deh-e Ra’īs Gārūk, Deh-e Ra’īsī, and Ra’īsī) is a city in Irandegan District, Khash County, Sistan and Baluchestan province, Iran. At the 2006 census, its population was 433, in 107 families. At the 2016 census, its population was 765.

References 

Populated places in Khash County